Lionis Martínez Ramírez (born 2 March 1989) is a Cuban football player. He plays for FC Santiago de Cuba.

International
He made his Cuba national football team on 23 March 2018 in a friendly against Nicaragua, as a starter.

He was selected for the country's 2019 CONCACAF Gold Cup squad.

References

External links
 
 

Living people
1989 births
Cuban footballers
Cuba international footballers
Association football defenders
FC Santiago de Cuba players
2019 CONCACAF Gold Cup players
Sportspeople from Santiago de Cuba
21st-century Cuban people